In mathematics, a nonlocal operator is a mapping which maps functions on a topological space to functions, in such a way that the value of the output function at a given point cannot be determined solely from the values of the input function in any neighbourhood of any point. An example of a nonlocal operator is the Fourier transform.

Formal definition

Let  be a topological space,  a set,  a function space containing functions with domain , and  a function space containing functions with domain . A nonlocal operator is an operator which is not local.

For a nonlocal operator this is not possible.

Examples

Differential operators are examples of local operators. A large class of (linear) nonlocal operators is given by the integral transforms, such as the Fourier transform and the Laplace transform. For an integral transform of the form

An example of a singular integral operator is the fractional Laplacian

The prefactor  involves the Gamma function and serves as a normalizing factor. The fractional Laplacian plays a role in, for example, the study of nonlocal minimal surfaces.

Applications

Some examples of applications of nonlocal operators are:

Time series analysis using Fourier transformations
Analysis of dynamical systems using Laplace transformations
Image denoising using non-local means
Modelling Gaussian blur or motion blur in images using convolution with a blurring kernel or point spread function

See also
Fractional calculus
Linear map
Nonlocal Lagrangian
Action at a distance

References

External links 
Nonlocal equations wiki

Mathematical analysis
Functions and mappings